Ringwood Football Club, nicknamed the Redbacks, is an Australian rules football team. It is based in the eastern suburbs of Melbourne, Victoria, Australia and is part of the Eastern Football League.

History

Although football had been played in the district since the early 1890s, the club wasn't founded until 1899. Since its founding the club has always been involve in the local suburban competition in its area. From the Reporter League to the Ringwood District competition followed by the Croydon-Ferntree Gully FL and now the Eastern FL.
The Ringwood Football Club was originally based at East Ringwood Reserve before relocating to Ringwood Reserve in 1930. In 1959, the Club relocated to Jubilee Park.

Ringwood Football Club had commenced by at least 1882

It became one of the founding clubs of the Eastern District Football League in 1962.

Premierships

 1923, 1924, 1932, 1934, 1948, 1955, 1956, 1957,  1959, 1962, 1972, 1976, 2005

VFL/AFL players

 Aubrey Neal - 
 Enos Thomas - , 
 Joshua Croft - 
 Tom McCaffrey - 
 Stan Ogden - , 
 Gordon Lindsay - 
 Jim Ross - 
 Jim Morgan - 
 Stan Beal - 
 Frank Slater - 
 Robin Close - 
 John Carpenter - 
 Neil Clarke - 
 Paul Van Der Haar - 
 Paul Considine - 
 Enrico Misso - 
 Geoff Parker - 
 Haydn Robins - , 
 Kane Johnson - , 
 Matthew Banks - 
 Mark Bolton -

External links
  Official club website
 Official Eastern Football League site

Eastern Football League (Australia) clubs
Australian rules football clubs established in 1899
1899 establishments in Australia
Sport in the City of Maroondah